El Gallo (Spanish for "The Rooster") may refer to

Fictional characters
El Gallo, a character in the musical The Fantasticks

Geology
El Gallo Formation, in Mexico

People
Luis Aguilar (actor) (1918–97), Mexican actor and singer "El Gallo Giro"
Martín Castillo (born 1977), Mexican boxer "El Gallo"
Juan de la Rosa (born 1986), Mexican boxer "El Gallo Negro"
Valentín Elizalde (1979–2006), Mexican singer "El Gallo de Oro"
José Gómez Ortega (1895–1920), Spanish matador "El Gallo"
Rafael Gómez Ortega (1882–1960), Spanish matador "El Gallo"
Antonio Rivera (1963–2005), Puerto Rican boxer "El Gallo Rivera"
José Antonio Rivera (born 1973), American boxer "El Gallo"
Tito Rojas (born 1955), Puerto Rican singer "El Gallo"
El Gallo (wrestler) (born 1984), ring name of Mexican masked professional wrestler
Rosendo "El Gallo" Díaz, singer, Cuban salsa and timba ensemble, Manolito y su Trabuco 
Wil Myers (born 1990), professional baseball player "El Gallo"

Ships
 a British tanker in service 1946–59

Places
San Rafael, New Mexico, also known as "El Gallo"